Kenneth Raymond Andrews, FBA (26 August 1921 – 6 January 2012) was a British historian. He was Professor of History at the University of Hull from 1979 to 1988.

A specialist of the history English exploration, Andrews was known for his work on Elizabethan privateers, in particular Sir Francis Drake.

References 

1921 births
2012 deaths
Place of birth missing
20th-century British historians
21st-century British historians
Fellows of the British Academy
Academics of the University of Hull
Alumni of King's College London
People from London